Rhamnus crenulata is a species of plant in the family Rhamnaceae. It is endemic to the Canary Islands of Spain.  It is threatened by Mediterranean Matorral shrubland habitat loss. In the Canary Islands it is also known as espinero and to the wider community as Canary Buckthorn.

References

crenulata
Endemic flora of the Canary Islands
Matorral shrubland
Near threatened plants
Taxonomy articles created by Polbot